Alan Haberman (July 27, 1929 in Worcester, Massachusetts – June 12, 2011 in Newton, Massachusetts) was an American supermarket executive who is credited with popularizing the use of the barcode in commerce internationally. Haberman was a founder and board member of the Uniform Code Council.  He graduated from Harvard College and Harvard Business School.

See also 
 George J. Laurer, U.P.C. creator

References 

1929 births
2011 deaths
American businesspeople
Barcodes
Harvard College alumni
Harvard Business School alumni
American company founders